Do Khaharan may refer to the following articles:
 Alborz
 Do Khvaharan